Maxinkuckee is an unincorporated community in Union Township, Marshall County, Indiana.

A post office was established at Maxinkuckee in 1857, and remained in operation until it was discontinued in 1902. The community took its name from Lake Maxinkuckee.

Geography

References

Unincorporated communities in Marshall County, Indiana
Unincorporated communities in Indiana
1857 establishments in Indiana